Shin Jae-Heum (신재흠, born March 26, 1959, in South Korea) is a South Korean footballer.

Honours

References
 

1959 births
Living people
South Korean footballers
Busan IPark players
FC Seoul players
K League 1 players
FC Seoul non-playing staff
Yonsei University alumni
Association football defenders